Levante Unión Deportiva, S.A.D. is a Spanish football club in Valencia, in the namesake autonomous community.

Founded on 9 September 1909, Levante play in Segunda División, holding home games at Ciutat de València Stadium.

History

Early years (1909–1935) 

Levante UD was formerly registered as Levante Football Club on 9 September 1909 (celebrating its 100th anniversary on 9 September 2009).  Levante Union Deportiva (Football Club) has the eastern region of the Iberian Peninsula as its namesake. Levante is Spain's east coast, the coast where the sun always rises (rise in Spanish being levantar).  Levante UD's name is likewise attributed to the Levant wind that comes from the east and reminiscent of the Levante beach in La Malvarrosa, where Levante Football Club (as Levante Union Deportiva was originally named) clashed some of its earliest fixtures.  Historically backed, Levante Union Deportiva is the most senior football club in Valencia. Local rival team Valencia CF was not formed until 1919.

Levante's earliest games were played at La Platjeta, near the docks on a plot of land owned by a perfume entrepreneur. Its next ground was also near the port area, and the club gradually began to become associated with the working class. In 1919, the side played Valencia CF for the first time, losing 0–1; the game marked the inauguration of the recently formed new ground at Algirós. In 1928, Levante FC won its first trophy, the Valencian Championship.

1909 also saw the birth of Gimnástico Football Club, which originally played at Patronato de la Juventud Obrera, being then named Gimnástico-Patronato. In 1919, Gimnástico became the champion of the Campeonato de Valencia, beating CD Castellón in two leg finals; the next year, the club had become Real Gimnástico Football Club, after being granted royal patronage by Alfonso XIII, and they reached the final of Campeonato Regional de Levante, but lost to Club Deportivo Aguileño. In 1931, with the emergence of the Second Spanish Republic, the club dropped the Real from its name.

In 1934–35, both Levante and Gimnástico debuted in the second division, when the league was expanded from 10 teams to 24. In 1935, Levante won the Campeonato Levante-Sur, a competition that featured teams from Valencia, Murcia and Andalusia, and subsequently reached the semi-finals of the Spanish Cup, consecutively beating Valencia and Barcelona before losing to eventual runners-up Sabadell.

During the civil war: Copa de la España Libre (1937)
During the Spanish Civil War, Levante and Gimnástico played in the Mediterranean League, finishing fifth and sixth respectively – teams from this league also competed in the Copa de la España Libre ("Free Spain Cup"). It was originally intended that the top four teams from the league would enter the cup, but Barcelona opted to tour Mexico and the United States, and as a result, Levante took its place. The first round of the competition was a mini-league with the top two teams, Levante and Valencia, qualifying for the final. On 18 July 1937, Levante defeated its city rivals 1–0 at the Montjuïc.

Merging: Gimnástico and Levante (1939) 

During the Civil War, Levante's ground was destroyed, but the club's squad remained intact. In contrast, Gimnástico had a ground, Estadio de Vallejo, but had lost most of their players. As a result, in 1939 Levante FC and Gimnástico FC merged into Levante Unión Deportiva. Levante UD thus having origin from at least 1909 from both Levante FC and Gimnástico FC.  At first being named Unión Deportiva Levante-Gimnástico, then changing it a few years later to Levante Unión Deportiva, with current club colours also dating from this era (the blaugrana, blue-garnet, home colours were originally those of Gimnástico FC, while the black and white away kit, were the colours of Levante FC). Moreover, Levante UD not only inherited their colors from Gimnástico FC but also their nickname, "Granota", the Frogs.

La Liga: relegations and promotions (1963–present) 
Levante had to wait until the 1960s to make its La Liga debut. In 1963, the club finished runner-up in Group II of the second division, defeating Deportivo de La Coruña 4–2 on aggregate in the promotion play-offs. During the first top flight season, it managed to win both games against Valencia, managing a 5–1 home win against Barcelona in the 1964–65 campaign but being relegated nonetheless after losing in the playoffs against Málaga. It spent most of the following two decades in the second and third divisions; the Segunda División B would not be created until 1977.

In the early 1980s, Dutch superstar Johan Cruyff played half a season for the club, retiring three years later. After winning 2003–04's second division, Levante returned to the top level but survived only one season. Finishing third in 2005–06, it returned for two additional campaigns, the decisive match in the 2006–07 season being a 4–2 home win against Valencia courtesy of Riga Mustapha (two goals), Salva and Laurent Courtois.

Levante's financial status worsened, however, and there were reports that the players had only received approximately one-fifth of their contractual payments. News reports stated that the club had incurred a debt of over €18 million in payments due to its players. The team plummeted down the standings, and it was confirmed that the club would be playing in the second division in 2008–09, with several matches to go. The players protested at their lack of payments at one point, refusing to move for several seconds after the opening whistle against Deportivo and later announcing that they would issue a job action during the season-ending game at Real Madrid. The action was resolved when league officials announced that a benefit game would be played between Levante team members, and a team made up of players from the first division, with all benefits going to pay the wages due to the players.

On 13 June 2010, Levante returned to La Liga after a 3–1 home win against already relegated Castellón. It lost in the final round 0–4 at Real Betis, but its opponents only managed to finish with the same points as fourth. Under the manager who led the team back to the top flight, Luis García Plaza, Levante finally retained its division status in the 2010–11 season. During one point of the league's second round of matches, Levante was in third position in the Liga table, only behind Barcelona and Real Madrid after losing just once in 12 games, against Real Madrid.

On 26 October 2011, during round nine of the season, Levante defeated Real Sociedad 3–2 to move top of the table with 23 points. It was the first time in the club's history it reached the highest ranking in the top division. In the process, it recorded seven-straight wins after drawing its first two games. The club eventually finished in sixth position after defeating Athletic Bilbao 3–0 at home in its last match, thus qualifying for the UEFA Europa League for the first time in its history. There, they made it to the last 16 before a 2–0 extra-time loss to Russia's FC Rubin Kazan.

In the 2015–16 season, Levante was relegated after defeat by Málaga and finished last. The club was promoted back to the first league in 2016–17, winning the Segunda División title. In the 2017–18 season, the club secured safety in the league and on 13 May, beat the champions Barcelona by a scoreline 5–4 (initially leading 5–1), with Emmanuel Boateng scoring his first ever career hat-trick. This win ended Barcelona's hopes of achieving an unbeaten season.

In the 2021–22 season, Levante was relegated after being defeated 0-6 by Real Madrid, ending their 5 years in top tier.

Seasons

Recent history

European record

Season to season

16 seasons in La Liga
39 seasons in Segunda División
12 seasons in Segunda División B
16 seasons in Tercera División
1 season in Categorías Regionales

Players

Current squad
.

Reserve team

Out on loan

Club officials

Current technical staff

Notable former players
Note: this list includes players that have appeared in at least 100 league games and/or have reached international status.

Coaches

Honours

National competitions
Copa de la España Libre
Winners: 1937
Segunda División
Winners: 2003–04, 2016–17
Segunda División B
Winners: 1978–79, 1988–89, 1994–95, 1995–96, 1998–99
Tercera División
Winners: 1931–32, 1943–44, 1945–46, 1953–54, 1955–56, 1972–73, 1975–76

Regional competitions
Campeonato de Valencia
Winners: 1927–28
Campeonato Levante-Sur
Winners: 1934–35

Friendly tournaments
Trofeo Costa de Valencia 
Winners: 1972, 1974, 1977
Trofeo Comunidad Valenciana 
Winners: 1986
Trofeo Ciutat de València
Winners: 1995
Trofeo Ciudad de Valencia
Winners: 1997
Trofeo de la Generalitat Valenciana
Winners: 2000

Stadium

Estadi Ciutat de València was opened on 9 September 1969, with capacity for 25,354 spectators. Dimensions are 107x69 meters.

Due to the 2019–20 season's late finish because of the COVID-19 pandemic, and renovation work at their stadium, Levante concluded the campaign behind closed doors at the Estadi Olímpic Camilo Cano in La Nucia, Province of Alicante.

Rivals

Levante contest the Derbi Valenciano, also known as the Derbi del Turia or Derbi Valentino, with local rivals Valencia. The fixture has only been played 38 times competitively, however, with Valencia currently holding 21 wins to Levante's 8.

See also
Atlético Levante UD, reserve team of Levante UD
Levante UD Femenino, women's team
Levante UD (beach soccer), beach soccer department

References

External links

  (Spanish, Valencian, English)
 LaLiga Levante Unión Deportiva 1909 Forever
 Levante UD at UEFA 

 
La Liga clubs
Football clubs in Valencia
Football clubs in the Valencian Community
Association football clubs established in 1909
1909 establishments in Spain
Segunda División clubs